Armillaria yungensis is a species of agaric fungus in the family Physalacriaceae. This species is found in South America.

See also 
 List of Armillaria species

References 

Fungi described in 1970
Fungi of South America
Fungal tree pathogens and diseases
yungensis
Taxa named by Rolf Singer